Joseph Cornelis (17 November 1917 – 2000) was a Belgian boxer who competed in the 1936 Summer Olympics. He was eliminated in a quarterfinal bout of the bantamweight class after losing his fight to the eventual gold medalist Ulderico Sergo.

1936 Olympic results
Below are the results of Joseph Cornelis, a Belgian bantamweight boxer who competed at the 1936 Berlin Olympics:

 Round of 32: bye
 Round of 16: defeated Jose Vergara (Chile) by decision
 Quarterfinal: lost to Ulderico Sergo (Italy) by decision

References

External links
 
Joseph Cornelis' profile at Sports Reference.com

1917 births
2000 deaths
Bantamweight boxers
Olympic boxers of Belgium
Boxers at the 1936 Summer Olympics
Belgian male boxers